The Bergkirchweih is an annual Volksfest (beer festival and travelling funfair) in Erlangen, Germany.
Locals nickname it Berch, which is the East Franconian pronunciation of the German word Berg, meaning mountain or hill.

The Bergkirchweih starts on the Thursday before Pentecost at 5 PM. The opening ceremony called "Anstich", which is carried out by the city's mayor, takes place at a different beer cellar, the traditional storage and cooling facilities of the local breweries, every year.  Thousands gather to watch the opening spectacle hoping to receive a stein of free beer of the first barrel.
Traditionally, twelve days later the last beer barrel is buried at the cellar where the next Anstich will take place.

The Bergkirchweih area is located in the north of the city of Erlangen and is roughly a kilometer long (0.6 mi).
It consists of beer cellars and a long road with spaces for booths and rides; a huge Ferris wheel is the Berch's traditional landmark.

With its wooden benches under elm, chestnut and oak trees it is one of the biggest Open Air Biergartens of Europe boasting more than 11,000 seats.

The Bergkirchweih has taken place since 21. April 1755, making it 55 years older than the Oktoberfest. Locals often refer to the two week window when the beer festival is taking place as the "fifth season". Roughly a million people - about ten times the city's population - visit the event, making the Bergkirchweih, together with Oktoberfest in Munich, Gäubodenvolksfest in Straubing, Michaeliskirchweih in Fürth and Volksfest in Nuremberg one of the great five in Bavaria.

There was an American Military Kaserne (Ferris Barracks) located in southern Erlangen until 1994. Soldiers commonly referred to the festival as the "Strawberry Festival", probably due to the difficulty in pronouncing 'Bergkirchweih'.

Local traditions
While most visitors to the festival will choose comfortable clothing to spend the day outdoors and potentially dance on the long benches and tables to the music of the variety of bands playing, many visitors will also opt to use the occasion to wear their most traditional Bavarian or Franconian outfits, such as Lederhosen and Dirndl. 

A common locally evolving tradition during the festival is the so-called Kastenlauf (crate walk). A crate of beer (20 bottles each 1/2 litre) is pulled or carried on a walk to the festival with friends. The goal is for the crate to be empty upon arrival at the festival, relating the evolution of Kastenlauf to that of pre-gaming.

Nowadays the last song played during the festival every year is Lili Marleen while locals sing along and wave tissues as the last barrel of beer is symbolically being buried.

See also
Beer festival

External links 
 Bergkirchweih Erlangen | berch.info – official Website 
 Webcam from the Bergkirchweih – since 2009 the only webcam with live images and archive

References

Beer festivals in Germany
Erlangen
Tourist attractions in Bavaria
Annual events in Germany